Kargın (formerly Altunkent) is a municipality (belde) in the Tercan District, Erzincan Province, Turkey. The municipality is mostly populated by Turkmens and had a population of 2,083 in 2021.

It is divided into the neighborhoods of Camii Şerif, İstasyon, Sucuali, Şehit Ahmet Aytekin and Yollarüstu (Vîcan). The settlement of Yollarüstu is populated by both Kurds and Turkmens. Sucuali is populated by Kurds of the Balaban tribe.

References 

Kurdish settlements in Erzincan Province

Towns in Turkey
Populated places in Erzincan Province